Daşbulaq or Dashboulagh or Dashbulak or Dashbulakh or Dashbulaq or Dashbolagh or Dash Bolagh or Dash Bulaq may refer to:

Azerbaijan
Dağ Daşbulaq, Azerbaijan
Daşbulaq, Gadabay, Azerbaijan
Daşbulaq, Kalbajar, Azerbaijan
Daşbulaq, Khojali, Azerbaijan
Daşbulaq, Shaki, Azerbaijan
Daşbulaq, Shamkir, Azerbaijan
Dəllər Daşbulaq, Azerbaijan

Iran

Ardabil Province
Dash Bolagh, Germi, a village in Germi County
Dash Bolagh, Anguti, a village in Germi County
Dash Bolagh, Meshgin Shahr, a village in Meshgin Shahr County
Dash Bolagh Kandi, a village in Meshgin Shahr County
Dash Bolagh, Nir, a village in Nir County

East Azerbaijan Province
Dashbolagh, Ahar, a village in Ahar County
Dashbolagh-e Moghar, a village in Ahar County
Dash Bolagh-e Olya, a village in Charuymaq County
Dash Bolagh-e Pain, a village in Charuymaq County
Dash Bolagh, Hashtrud, a village in Hashtrud County
Dash Bolagh, Malekan, a village in Malekan County
Dash Bolagh, Maragheh, a village in Maragheh County
Dash Bolagh, Meyaneh, a village in Meyaneh County

Kurdistan Province
Dash Bolagh, Kurdistan, a village in Qorveh County

West Azerbaijan Province
Dash Bolagh, West Azerbaijan, a village in Takab County

Zanjan Province
Dash Bolagh, Zanjan, Iran
Dash Bolagh, Abhar, Zanjan Province, Iran
Dash Bolagh, Khodabandeh, Zanjan Province, Iran

See also
Bash Bolagh (disambiguation)